The third season of Weeds premiered on August 13, 2007, and consisted of 15 episodes. Metacritic gives the season a score of 82.

Plot 
The season begins with the fallout of the botched drug deal. Celia finds and destroys the entire harvest; U-Turn pays the mobsters to leave Nancy and him alone; Silas is arrested and sentenced to community service; Sanjay comes out of the closet, but U-Turn forces him to have sex with a woman who becomes pregnant with his child. During season three, Silas and Shane remain the same age, however, as the season proceeds Shane turns twelve.

During the first half of the season, Nancy works to pay off her debt to U-Turn, owed because U-Turn saved her life, and because of Celia destroying the harvest. Nancy also gets a legitimate job working for Sullivan Groff, a crooked developer from the neighboring community of Majestic, and soon pursues a sexual affair with him. Celia, who has also been intimate with Groff, resents Nancy for this.

Nancy wants to get back into the business, and Doug "borrows" $50,000 from Agrestic's public treasury so Nancy can buy MILF weed. Silas meets Tara, an evangelical Christian who enjoys smoking pot, and convinces Nancy to let him and Tara join her operation. Nancy turns Silas over to Conrad, so Silas can learn how to grow. Shane and Isabelle become outcasts at the heavily-religious Majestic summer school and form a friendship. As familial stress increases, Shane begins having conversations with his dead father and insists Judah is really there. Nancy is terrified that her arrest is imminent when she is unexpectedly called in by the DEA. It turns out that the DEA has discovered her marriage to Peter, and a hefty life insurance payment awaits.

At U-Turn's behest, Conrad and Heylia start a grow business. U-Turn sees talent in Nancy and trains her to be his lieutenant, while simultaneously starting a war with rival Mexican dealers. When U-Turn has a heart attack while jogging, Marvin suffocates him and becomes the new boss. Marvin then botches an attempted truce with the Mexicans, allowing Nancy to clear all debts for her and Conrad and end the gang war.

Debt-free, but feeling lonely, Nancy befriends Peter's ex-wife, Valerie. The two initially bond over their troubled lives, but the friendship turns sour when Valerie demands Peter's life-insurance money; Valerie feels it is rightfully hers, due to her longer marriage to Peter and the child they had together. Nancy promises to give the money, but first uses it to replace the money Doug took from the Agrestic treasury. Despite receiving several payments, Valerie believes that Nancy will never give her the full amount, and she hires a private investigator to trail Nancy. The investigator discovers Nancy's drug activities and blackmails her for the remainder of the life-insurance money. Nancy pays him and ensures the investigator won't come after her again. Nancy later confronts Valerie and tells her she no longer has any money, thanks to the investigator Valerie hired.

Meanwhile, the nearby community of Majestic has been attempting a hostile takeover of Agrestic, with Doug leading due to the large amount of money it would bring in. But Groff's gift—a new house in Majestic—to Celia leads to jealousy, and Doug begins sabotaging the Majestic city infrastructure. However, it is too late, as Celia puts it to a public referendum. To get back at Groff, Doug steals the giant cross from Majestic's megachurch, eventually putting it inside the grow house. When Heylia and Conrad are forced to move the grow operation, Nancy negotiates the use of Celia's off-the-books house in Majestic. While hanging out at the grow house, Nancy and Conrad begin a sexual relationship, but Conrad realizes he has no future with her. Andy befriends a group of bikers, who want Nancy to start selling their low-quality weed. When Nancy refuses, the bikers threaten her family; Nancy turns to Guillermo—the leader of the Mexican dealers—to get protection. Guillermo decides to burn down the bikers' marijuana field, causing a huge fire which spreads to the Agrestic area. At that time, thermal cameras spot the stolen cross and the DEA moves in.

Nancy takes advantage of the fire, pouring gasoline throughout her house and lighting it with a match, ensuring that she and her family will be leaving and moving on, and that there will be no evidence of their drug activities.

Cast

Main cast 
Mary-Louise Parker as Nancy Botwin (15 episodes)
Elizabeth Perkins as Celia Hodes (15 episodes)
Tonye Patano as Heylia James (12 episodes)
Romany Malco as Conrad Shepherd (15 episodes)
Hunter Parrish as Silas Botwin (15 episodes)
Alexander Gould as Shane Botwin (15 episodes)
Andy Milder as Dean Hodes (10 episodes)
Allie Grant as Isabelle Hodes (10 episodes)
Justin Kirk as Andy Botwin (15 episodes)
Kevin Nealon as Doug Wilson (15 episodes)

Special guest stars 
Zooey Deschanel as Kat Wheeler
Matthew Modine as Sullivan Groff
Mary-Kate Olsen as Tara Lindman

Recurring cast 

Indigo as Vaneeta James
Guillermo Díaz as Guillermo García Gómez
Renée Victor as Lupita
Fatso-Fasano as Marvin
Maulik Pancholy as Sanjay Patel
Tyrone Mitchell as Keeyon James
Brooke Smith as Valerie Scottson
Becky Thyre as Pam Gruber
Daryl Sabara as Tim Scottson
Julanne Chidi Hill as Clinique
Page Kennedy as U-Turn
Jack Stehlin as Captain Roy Till
Sprague Grayden as Denise
Sharon Sachs as Eve Meriweather
Rick Scarry as Brendan Kelly
Patricia Harris-Smith as Sarah
Richard Hilton as Harry
Sammy Fine as Benj
Bob Rumnock as Mr. Lippman
Eric Cadora as Agent Shuman
Shawn Michael Patrick as Agent Fundis
Robert Allen Mukes as Abumchuk
Justin Huen as Rodriguez
Lisa Darr as Ann Carilli
Tim Colceri as Sergeant Lewis
Scott Klace as Paul St. Moritz
Don Perry as Mr. Mertes
William Francis McGuire as Desk Cop
Rod Rowland as Chess
Randy Thompson as Mitch Kamin
Rod Britt as Peter Gregory
Paul F. Tompkins as Bob
Steven Hack as Brian McNally
Steve Tom as Col. Kors
Jessica Jaymes as Jessica
Giovanni Lopes as Manuel
Lexington Steele as Lexington

Episodes

References

External links 
 
 

 
2007 American television seasons